The Rift Valley lakes are a series of lakes in the East African Rift valley that runs through eastern Africa from Ethiopia in the north to Malawi in the south, and includes the African Great Lakes in the south. These include some of the world's oldest lakes, deepest lakes, largest lakes by area, and largest lakes by volume. Many are freshwater ecoregions of great biodiversity, while others are alkaline "soda lakes" supporting highly specialised organisms.

The Rift Valley lakes are well known for the evolution of at least 800 cichlid fish species that live in their waters. More species are expected to be discovered.

The World Wide Fund for Nature has designated these lakes as one of its Global 200 priority ecoregions for conservation.

Geology
Lake Malawi and Lake Tanganyika have formed in the various valleys of the East African Rift zone.

Ecology
Lake Kivu's "still waters ... hide another face: dissolved within are billions of cubic meters of flammable methane and more still of carbon dioxide, the result of volcanic gases seeping in."

Ethiopian Rift Valley lakes national park 

The Ethiopian Rift Valley lakes are the northernmost of the African Rift Valley lakes. In central Ethiopia, the Main Ethiopian Rift, also known as the Great Rift Valley, splits the Ethiopian highlands into northern and southern halves, and the Ethiopian Rift Valley lakes occupy the floor of the rift valley between the two highlands. Most of the Ethiopian Rift Valley lakes do not have an outlet, and most are alkaline. Although the Ethiopian Rift Valley lakes are of great importance to Ethiopia's economy, as well as being essential to the survival of the local people, there were no intensive and extensive limnological studies undertaken of these lakes until recently.

The major ones are
 Lake Abaya (areal extent , elevation , maximum depth ), the largest Ethiopian Rift Valley lake by surface area
 Lake Chamo (areal extent , elevation , maximum depth )
 Lake Zway or Dambal (areal extent , elevation , maximum depth )
 Lake Shala (areal extent , elevation , maximum depth ), the deepest Ethiopian Rift Valley lake and the largest by water volume
 Koka Reservoir (areal extent , elevation , maximum depth not listed)
 Lake Langano (areal extent , elevation , maximum depth )
 Lake Abijatta (areal extent , elevation , maximum depth )
 Lake Awasa (areal extent , elevation , maximum depth )

Lake Tana, the source of the Blue Nile, lies in the Ethiopian highlands north of the Rift Valley; however, it is not a Rift Valley lake.

Eastern Rift Valley lakes 

South of the Ethiopian highlands, the rift valley splits into two major troughs. The Eastern Rift is home to the Kenyan Rift Valley lakes, while most of the Central African Rift Valley lakes lie in the Western Rift.  This area includes the Gregory Rift in Kenya and Tanzania.

Kenya 
The Kenyan section of the Rift Valley is home to eight lakes, of which three are freshwater and the rest alkaline. Of the latter, the shallow soda lakes of the Eastern Rift Valley have crystallised salt turning the shores white and are famous for the large flocks of flamingo that feed on crustaceans.
 Lake Baringo: second largest of the Kenyan Rift Valley lakes.
 , elevation , freshwater
 Lake Bogoria: shallow soda lake, a national preserve.
 , elevation 
 Lake Elmenteita: shallow soda lake.
 Lake Logipi: a shallow hot-spring fed soda lake in the Suguta Valley just south of Lake Turkana. Formerly Lake Suguta
 Lake Magadi: shallow soda lake near the southern border with Tanzania.
 Lake Naivasha:
  although it varies somewhat with rainfall, elevation , freshwater
 Lake Nakuru: shallow soda lake, has been a national park since 1968.
 , elevation 
 Lake Turkana: the largest of the Kenyan lakes, on the border of Kenya and Ethiopia.
 , elevation , freshwater

Tanzania
All the lakes in the Tanzanian section of this group are alkaline:
 Lake Eyasi: shallow soda lake
 Lake Makati: shallow soda lake
 Lake Manyara: shallow soda lake
 Lake Natron: shallow soda lake that has been categorised by the World Wildlife Fund as being in the East African halophytics ecoregion.

Western or Albertine Rift Valley lakes 

The lakes of the Western or Albertine Rift, with Lake Victoria, include the largest, deepest, and oldest of the Rift Valley Lakes. They are also referred to as the Central African lakes. Lakes Albert, Victoria, and Edward are part of the Nile River basin.

It is not in the rift valley, instead occupying a depression between the eastern and western rifts formed by the uplift of the rifts to either side. Lakes Victoria, Tanganyika, and Malawi are sometimes collectively known as the African Great Lakes.

The Western Rift Valley lakes are fresh water and home to an extraordinary number of species. Approximately 1,500 cichlid fish (Cichlidae) species live in the lakes. In addition to the cichlids, populations of Clariidae, Claroteidae, Mochokidae, Poeciliidae, Mastacembelidae, Centropomidae, Cyprinidae, Clupeidae and other fish families are found in these lakes. They are also important habitats for a number of amphibian species, including Amietophrynus kisoloensis, Bufo keringyagae, Cardioglossa cyaneospila, and Nectophryne batesii.

 Lake Albert (elevation ) is the northernmost lake in the western rift.
 Lake Edward (elevation ) drains north into Lake Albert
 Lake Kivu (elevation ) empties into Lake Tanganyika via the Ruzizi River.
 Lake Tanganyika (elevation ) is the largest and deepest of the Rift Valley lakes (more than ), and is the second deepest fresh water lake on the planet (after Lake Baikal). Below roughly 200 meters depth, its water is anoxic and devoid of life besides anoxic bacteria. It is very sensitive to climate. It is part of the Congo River basin, feeding into the River Congo via the Lukuga River.

Southern Rift Valley lakes (Tanzania and Malawi)
The Southern Rift Valley lakes are like the Western Rift Valley lakes in that, with one exception, they are freshwater lakes.
 Lake Rukwa (about  but quite variable) in Tanzania is the alkaline exception, lying south-east of Tanganyika, and has no outlet.
Also known as Lake Nyasa.
 Lake Malombe is on the Shire River.
 Lake Chilwa (elevation ) has no outlet but extensive wetlands. It is the southernmost of the Rift Valley lakes.

Other lakes of the Great Rift Valley 
 Lake Mweru ( elevation 922 m) lies in the Lake Mweru-Luapula graben, which is a branch off the Albertine rift.
 Lake Mweru Wantipa (elevation ) is a marshy lake between lakes Tanganyika and Mweru, and is endorheic but may overflow into Lake Mweru at times of very high flood.

References

External links
 Lakes of the African Rift Valley
 Lakes of the Rift Valley Project
 Africa Rift Valley Pictures From Helicopter by Michael Poliza

Freshwater ecoregions
Rift Valley lakes